Euchromius circulus is a moth in the family Crambidae. It was described by Schouten in 1992. It is found in Myanmar.

References

Crambinae
Moths described in 1992
Moths of Asia